Tin Town may refer to:

Birchinlee in Derbyshire, England
Tin Town, Luton, a suburb of Luton, Bedfordshire, England
Tin Town, Missouri, unincorporated community in Missouri, United States
Overslade, a suburb of Rugby, Warwickshire, England